Sławomir Bogusław Jeneralski (born 28 July 1961 in Bydgoszcz) is a Polish journalist and politician. He was elected to the Sejm on 25 September 2005, getting 4,343 votes in 4 Bydgoszcz district as a candidate from the Democratic Left Alliance list.

See also
Members of Polish Sejm 2005-2007

External links
Sławomir Jeneralski - parliamentary page - includes declarations of interest, voting record, and transcripts of speeches.

1961 births
Living people
Politicians from Bydgoszcz
Kazimierz Wielki University in Bydgoszcz alumni
Polish journalists
Members of the Polish Sejm 2005–2007
Democratic Left Alliance politicians